A list of films produced in the Tamil film industry in India in 1941:

1941

References 

Films, Tamil
Tamil
1941
1940s Tamil-language films